Sarah Ann may refer to:

 Sarah Ann (1799 ship)
 Sarah Ann (1811 ship)
 Sarah Ann, West Virginia